Kunya is the name of several inhabited localities in Russia.

Modern localities
Urban localities
Kunya, Pskov Oblast, a work settlement in Kunyinsky District of Pskov Oblast

Rural localities
Kunya, Perm Krai, a village under the administrative jurisdiction of the town of krai significance of Dobryanka in Perm Krai

Alternative names
Kunya, alternative name of Kunyi Vyselki, a village in Mochilskoye Rural Settlement of Serebryano-Prudsky District in Moscow Oblast;